Durham Township is one of six townships in Durham County, North Carolina, United States. The township had a population of 103,863, according to the 2000 census and is currently the most populous township in Durham County.

Geographically, Durham Township occupies  in central Durham County.  The township is almost completely occupied by portions of the city of Durham, the county seat of Durham County.

Townships in Durham County, North Carolina
Townships in North Carolina